Telmatobius atahualpai (common name: Amazonas water frog) is a species of frog in the family Telmatobiidae.
It is endemic to the Cordillera Central of northern Peru and found in the San Martín and Amazonas Regions at  asl.

Telmatobius atahualpai occur in humid subalpine páramo where these frogs live under rocks at the edge of small streams. Threats to this little known species are not well known.

References

atahualpai
Amphibians of Peru
Amphibians of the Andes
Endemic fauna of Peru
Páramo fauna
Amphibians described in 1993
Taxonomy articles created by Polbot